The 2010 Dunlop MSA British Touring Car Championship season was the 53rd British Touring Car Championship (BTCC) season. It began at Thruxton Circuit on 4 April and finished after 30 races over ten events at Brands Hatch on 10 October.

RML Chevrolet driver Jason Plato claimed the championship with a win in the penultimate race of the season leading home season long rival, Honda Racing Team's Matt Neal. On his way to his second BTCC crown, Plato claimed seven victories through the course of the season compared to Neal's five wins. The final victory margin was 31 points. Neal's teammate Gordon Shedden also had a shot at the title heading into the final round but a broken driveshaft immediately prior to the start of Race 2 at Brands Hatch left him too far adrift and he finished the title 42 points behind Plato.

Despite finishing fourth in the outright points chase Arena Motorsport Ford driver Tom Onslow-Cole lost the Independents' Trophy to team mate Tom Chilton. Chilton ended up eight points clear of Onslow-Cole with Motorbase Performance BMW driver Steven Kane finishing just two points behind Chilton.

The combined performances of Neal and Shedden won for the Honda Racing Team the Teams' title. It was the third title for Team Dynamics and the first time they had won the manufacturers crown for long-time partners Honda. The combined performances of Chilton and Onslow-Cole allowed Arena Motorsport to claim the Independent Teams' trophy, breaking a three-year stranglehold on that trophy by West Surrey Racing.

Teams and drivers
The official entry list was announced at the series' Media Day at Brands Hatch on 23 March 2010.

Team and driver changes

Team changes
 Vauxhall withdrew their manufacturer support from Triple Eight Race Engineering due to the economic crisis and the lack of official manufacturers in the BTCC. However, continued as a privateer team. RML gained the backing of Chevrolet to run a Works team in the series, while Honda returned as a manufacturer team with Team Dynamics.

Driver changes
Changed teams
 Rob Collard: Airwaves BMW → WSR
 John George: TH Motorsport → sunshine.co.uk with Tech-Speed Motorsport
 Mat Jackson: Racing Silverline → Airwaves BMW
 Andrew Jordan: VX Racing → Pirtek Racing
 James Nash: RML → Uniq Racing with Triple Eight
 Matt Neal: VX Racing → Honda Racing Team
 David Pinkney: Team Dynamics → Pinkney Motorsport

Entering/re-entering BTCC
 Tom Boardman: World Touring Car Championship (SUNRED Engineering) → Special Tuning UK
 Ben Collins: Le Mans Series (RML) → Airwaves BMW
 Martin Depper: Mini Challenge (Forster Motorsport) → Forster Motorsport
 Arthur Forster: Mini Challenge (Forster Motorsport) → Forster Motorsport
 Phil Glew: Renault Clio Cup UK (Team Pyro) → Uniq Racing with Triple Eight & Special Tuning UK
 Shaun Hollamby: Dunlop SportMaxx Cup (AmD Millteksport) → AmD Milltek Racing.com
 Steven Kane: FIA Formula Two Championship (test driver) → Airwaves BMW
 Alex MacDowall: Renault Clio Cup UK (Total Control Racing) → Silverline Chevrolet
 Andy Neate: Sabbatical (injury) → WSR
 Jeff Smith: Renault Clio Cup UK (Team Pyro) → Uniq Racing with Triple Eight
 Sam Tordoff: Renault Clio Cup UK (Total Control Racing) → Uniq Racing with Triple Eight
 Lea Wood: Welsh Sports and Saloon Car Championship (Team Wood Racing) → Central Group Racing

Leaving BTCC
 Jonathan Adam: Airwaves BMW → unknown
 Martyn Bell: Sunshine.co.uk with Tech-Speed → Sabbatical (injury)
 Dan Eaves: Clyde Valley Racing → unknown
 Johnny Herbert: Team Dynamics → Superstars Series (Motorzone)
 Stephen Jelley: West Surrey Racing → Porsche Carrera Cup Great Britain (Team Parker Racing)
 Adam Jones: Clyde Valley Racing → unknown
 Nick Leason: AFM Racing → unknown
 Liam McMillan: Maxtreme → unknown
 Alan Morrison: Team AON → unknown
 Anthony Reid: West Surrey Racing → Grand Prix Masters/World Sportscar Masters
 James Thompson: Team Dynamics → European Touring Car Cup & World Touring Car Championship (Hartmann Racing)
 Colin Turkington: West Surrey Racing → World Touring Car Championship (West Surrey Racing)
 Harry Vaulkhard: Bamboo Engineering → World Touring Car Championship (Bamboo Engineering)

Mid-season changes
 Phil Glew signed to race for Triple Eight shortly after the media day, but after competing at Thruxton he lost his drive when Uniq withdrew sponsorship from the team. He returned to the series in a second SEAT León run by Tom Boardman's Special Tuning UK team, under the YourRacingCar.com banner, at Silverstone, but the deal was for the single weekend.
 Fabrizio Giovanardi competed in the opening round for Triple Eight but left the team ahead of Rockingham due to lack of sponsorship.
 James Nash was signed by Triple Eight to be their sole representative from Rockingham onwards.
 Daniel Lloyd joined Triple Eight in a second car at Croft.
 Matt Hamilton withdrew from the round at Croft due to financial difficulties and missed the rest of the season. However he is looking at finding the funds to return in 2011.
 Jeff Smith joined Triple Eight in a second car at Knockhill.
 James Kaye returned to the series for the final two rounds after four years away, racing a Honda Integra under the 'WRC Developments with Barwell' banner.
 Sam Tordoff joined Triple Eight in a second car at the final round at Brands Hatch.
 Ben Collins joined Airwaves BMW in a third car at the final round at Brands Hatch.

Calendar
All races were held in the United Kingdom. The calendar was announced by the championship organisers on 7 October 2009, with no major changes from 2009.

Championship standings

No driver may collect more than one "Lead a Lap" point per race no matter how many laps they lead.
Race 1 polesitter receives 1 point.

Drivers Championship
(key)

Note: bold signifies pole position (1 point given in first race only, and race 2 and 3 poles are based on race results), italics signifies fastest lap (1 point given all races) and * signifies at least one lap in the lead (1 point given all races).

Manufacturers/Constructors Championship

Teams Championship

Independents Trophy

Independent Teams Trophy

References

External links
Official website of the British Touring Car Championship
BTCC Pages
Crash Net
Autosport

British Touring Car Championship seasons
Touring Car Championship